South Korea competed as Korea at the 1996 Summer Olympics in Atlanta, United States. 300 competitors, 189 men and 111 women, took part in 160 events in 25 sports.

Medalists

Archery

Korea's fifth appearance in Olympic archery earned them another pair of gold medals in the women's competitions as well as a silver medal and a bronze medal in the men's competitions. The only individual eliminated before the quarterfinals was Yoon Hye-Young, though she did set an Olympic record in the 36 arrow R32/R16 combined.

Men's Individual Competition:
 Oh Kyo-moon - Bronze medal match, Bronze medal (5-1)
 Kim Bo-ram - Quarterfinal, 5th place (3-1)
 Jang Yong-ho - Quarterfinal, 7th place (3-1)

Women's Individual Competition:
 Kim Kyung-wook - Final, Gold medal (6-0)
 Kim So-jun - Quarterfinal, 6th place (3-1)
 Yoon Hye-young - Round of 16, 9th place (2-1)

Men's Team Competition:
 Oh, Kim, and Jang - Final, Silver medal (3-1)

Women's Team Competition:
 Kim, Kim, and Yoon - Final, Gold medal (4-0)

Athletics

Men's Long Jump
 Sung Hee-jun
 Qualification — NM (→ did not advance)

Men's Marathon
 Lee Bong-ju — 2:12.39 (→  Silver medal)
 Kim Yi-yong — 2:16.17 (→ 12th place)
 Kim Wan-ki — did not finish (→ no ranking)

Women's Javelin Throw
 Lee Young-sun
 Qualification — 58.66m (→ did not advance)

Women's Shot Put 
 Lee Myung-sun 
 Qualification — 16.92m (→ did not advance)

Women's Marathon
 Oh Mi-ja — 2:36.54 (→ 30th place)
 Kang Soon-duk — did not finish (→ no ranking)
 Lee Mi-kyung — did not finish (→ no ranking)

Badminton

Baseball

Korea's first appearance in the Olympic baseball tournament resulted in a last-place finish for the team. The Koreans won only one game in the preliminary round, defeating the Netherlands. This put them in eighth place and ended their involvement in the competition.

Men's Team Competition:
 South Korea - 8th place (1-6)

Basketball

Men's tournament

Preliminary round

9th−12th place classification

11th place match

Women's tournament

Preliminary round

9th−12th place classification

9th place match

Boxing

Men's Bantamweight (– 54 kg)
 Bae Gi-ung

Men's Featherweight (– 57 kg)
 Shin Su-yeong
 First round — Lost to Ramaz Paliani (Russia), 7-10

Men's Lightweight
 Shin Eun-chul

Men's Light-Welterweight
 Han Hyeong-min

Men's Welterweight
 Bae Ho-jo

Men's Light-Middleweight
 Lee Wan-gyun

Men's Middleweight (– 75 kg)
 Mun Im-cheol
 First round — Lost to Bertrand Tetsia (Cameroon), 2-12

Men's Light-Heavyweight (– 81 kg)
 Lee Seung-bae

Men's Heavyweight (– 91 kg)
 Go Yeong-sam

Canoeing

Cycling

Road Competition
Women's Individual Road Race
 Kim Yong-Mi
 Final — did not finish (→ no ranking)

Track Competition
Men's Points Race
 Cho Ho-sung
 Final — 6 points (→ 7th place)

Diving

Men's 3m Springboard
 Lee Jong-hee
 Preliminary Heat — 293.52 (→ did not advance, 32nd place)

Women's 10m Platform
 Im Youn-gi
 Preliminary Heat — 180.15 (→ did not advance, 31st place)

 Kim Yeo-young
 Preliminary Heat — 166.56 (→ did not advance, 32nd place)

Fencing

Thirteen fencers, nine men and 4 women, represented South Korea in 1996.

Men's foil
 Kim Yeong-ho
 Kim Yong-guk
 Jeong Su-gi

Men's team foil
 Jeong Su-gi, Kim Yong-guk, Kim Yeong-ho

Men's épée
 Yang Noe-seong
 Jang Tae-seok
 Lee Sang-gi

Men's team épée
 Jang Tae-seok, Lee Sang-gi, Yang Noe-seong

Men's sabre
 Yu Sang-ju
 Seo Seong-jun
 Lee Hyo-geun

Men's team sabre
 Lee Hyo-geun, Seo Seong-jun, Yu Sang-ju

Women's foil
 Jeon Mi-gyeong

Women's épée
 Go Jeong-jeon
 Kim Hui-jeong
 Lee Geum-nam

Women's team épée
 Kim Hui-jeong, Go Jeong-jeon, Lee Geum-nam

Football

Gymnastics

Handball

Hockey

Men's team competition
 Preliminary round (group B)
 South Korea – Great Britain 2–2
 South Korea – Australia 2–3
 South Korea – South Africa 3–3
 South Korea – Netherlands 1–3
 South Korea – Malaysia 4–2

 Classification Matches
 5th/8th place: South Korea – India 4–4 (South Korea wins after penalty strokes, 5–3)
 5th/6th place: South Korea – Pakistan 3–1 → Fifth place

 Team roster
 Koo Jin-soo
 Shin Seok-kyo
 Han Beung-kook
 You Myung-keun
 Cho Myung-jun
 Jeon Jong-ha
 You Seung-jin
 Park Shin-heum
 Kang Keon-wook
 Kim Jong-yi
 Jeong Yong-kyun
 Song Seung-tae
 Kim Yong-bae
 Hong Kyung-suep
 Kim Young-kyu
 Kim Yoon

Women's Team Competition
 Preliminary Round Robin
 South Korea – Great Britain 5–0
 South Korea – United States 2–3
 South Korea – Netherlands 3–1
 South Korea – Australia 3–3
 South Korea – Spain 2–0

Judo

Modern pentathlon

Men's:
 Kim Mi-sub – 5367pts (11th place)

Rowing

Sailing

Shooting

Fourteen South Korean shooters (six men and eight women) qualified to compete in the following events:

Men

Women

Swimming

Men's 200m Freestyle
 Koh Yun-ho
 Heat – 1:52.80 (→ did not advance, 26th place)

Men's 400m Freestyle
 Woo Cheol
 Heat – 4:03.11 (→ did not advance, 30th place)

Men's 1500m Freestyle
 Lee Gyu-chang
 Heat – 15:47.92 (→ did not advance, 25th place)

Men's 100m Backstroke
 Kim Min-seok
 Heat – 58.43 (→ did not advance, 42nd place)

Men's 200m Backstroke
 Ji Sang-jun
 Heat – 2:01.39
 B-Final – 2:02.68 (→ 14th place)

Men's 100m Breaststroke
 Cho Kwang-jea
 Heat – 1:03.39 (→ did not advance, 24th place)

Men's 200m Butterfly
 Cho Kwang-jea
 Heat – 2:04.53 (→ did not advance, 35th place)

Men's 200m Individual Medley
 Kim Bang-hyun
 Heat – 2:06.99 (→ did not advance, 26th place)

Men's 400m Individual Medley
 Kim Bang-hyun
 Heat – 4:31.16 (→ did not advance, 21st place)

Men's 4 × 200 m Freestyle Relay
 Koh Yun-ho, Lee Gyu-chang, Woo Cheol, and Kim Min-seok
 Heat – 7:45.98 (→ did not advance, 14th place)

Men's 4 × 100 m Medley Relay
 Kim Min-Seok, Cho Kwang-jea, Yang Dae-chu, and Koh Yun-ho
 Heat – 3:50.83 (→ did not advance, 17th place)

Women's 100m Freestyle
 Lee Bo-eun
 Heat – 58.27 (→ did not advance, 35th place)

Women's 200m Freestyle
 Lee Jie-hyun
 Heat – 2:05.78 (→ did not advance, 32nd place)

Women's 400m Freestyle
 Jeong Eun-na
 Heat – 4:23.35 (→ did not advance, 31st place)

Women's 800m Freestyle
 Suh Hyun-soo
 Heat – 9:03.22 (→ did not advance, 24th place)

Women's 100m Backstroke
 Lee Ji-hyun
 Heat – 1:03.96 (→ did not advance, 18th place)

Women's 200m Backstroke
 Lee Chang-ha
 Heat – 2:14.18
 B-Final – 2:14.55 (→ 13th place)

Women's 100m Breaststroke
 Byun Hye-young
 Heat – 1:12.85 (→ did not advance, 30th place)

Women's 200m Breaststroke
 Roh Joo-hee
 Heat – 2:36.20 (→ did not advance, 26th place)

Women's 200m Individual Medley
 Lee Jie-hyun
 Heat – 2:22.97 (→ did not advance, 35th place)

Women's 400m Individual Medley
 Lee Ji-hyun
 Heat – 4:59.52 (→ did not advance, 28th place)

Women's 4 × 100 m Freestyle Relay
 Lee Bo-eun, Seo So-yung, Lee Jie-hyun, and Jeong Eun-na
 Heat – 3:57.83 (→ did not advance, 19th place)

Women's 4 × 200 m Freestyle Relay
 Jeong Eun-na, Lee Bo-eun, Lee Jie-hyun, and Seo So-yung
 Heat – 8:22.90 (→ did not advance, 18th place)

Women's 4 × 100 m Medley Relay
 Lee Ji-hyun, Byun Hye-young, Park Woo-hee, and Lee Bo-eun
 Heat – 4:18.98 (→ did not advance, 18th place)

Table tennis

Tennis

Volleyball

Men's Indoor Team Competition
 Preliminary round (group B)
 Lost to Italy (0-3)
 Lost to Yugoslavia (0-3)
 Lost to Russia (0-3)
 Defeated Tunisia (3-0)
 Lost to Netherlands (2-3) → Did not advance, 10th place

 Team roster
 Bang Sin-bong
 Shin Young-chul
 Choi Cheon-sik
 Ha Jong-hwa
 Im Do-hun
 Kim Sang-woo
 Kim Se-jin
 Lee Seong-hui
 Park Hee-sang
 Park Sun-chool
 Sin Jin-sik
 Shin Jung-sub

Women's Indoor Team Competition
 Preliminary round (group A)
 Defeated Japan (3-0)
 Lost to China (2-3)
 Defeated Ukraine (3-0)
 Lost to the Netherlands (1-3)
 Lost to United States (1-3)
 Quarterfinals
 Lost to Brazil (0-3)
 Classification Matches
 Defeated United States (3-0)
 Lost to the Netherlands (0-3) → Sixth place

 Team roster
 Chang So-yun
 Chang Yoon-hee
 Choi Kwang-hee
 Chung Sun-hye
 Eoh Yeon-soon
 Hong Ji-yeon
 Kang Hye-mi
 Kim Nam-soon
 Lee In-sook
 Lee Soo-jung
 Park Soo-jeong
 Yoo Yeon-gyeong 
 Head coach: Kim Cheol-yong

Weightlifting

Wrestling

References

Korea, South
1996
Olympics